Luc Ferry (born 3 January 1951) is a French philosopher and politician, and a proponent of secular humanism. He is a former member of the Saint-Simon Foundation think-tank.

Biography

He received an Agrégation de philosophie (1975), a Doctorate in Political science (1981), and an Agrégation in political science (1982).
As a professor of political science and political philosophy, Luc Ferry taught at the Institut d'études politiques de Lyon (1982–1988)—during which time he also taught and directed graduate research at the University of Paris 1 Pantheon-Sorbonne—, then at the University of Caen (1989–96). He finally was a professor at Paris Diderot University from 1996 until he resigned in 2011 when asked to actually teach there.

From 2002 and until 2004 he served as the Minister of Education on the cabinet led by the conservative Prime Minister Jean-Pierre Raffarin. During his tenure, he was the minister in charge of the implementation of the French law on secularity and conspicuous religious symbols in schools. He received the award of Docteur honoris causa from the Université de Sherbrooke (Canada). He is the 2013 Telesio Galilei Academy of science Laureate for Philosophy.

He was created Chevalier (Knight) of the Bacchanalian fraternity De La Dive Bouteille De Gaillac on the 20 March 2012 together with French mathematician Max Karoubi and Italian philosopher Francesco Fucilla.

He is the creator of the comic book series La Sagesse des mythes which is based on Greek mythology and is published since 2016.

Despite repeated efforts, Luc Ferry was rejected for the third time by the Académie Française, in January 2019.

As a humanist, Ferry is highly critical of animal rights, deep ecology and environmentalism which he dismisses for elevating the moral status of nature.

Controversies
In June 2011, Ferry announced on television that he knew about a former government minister who had sexually abused young boys in an orgy in Morocco. According to him, the case was known at the highest levels of the French state, but he provided no specifics as to the persons involved, citing the risk of being sued for libel. A criminal investigation was then opened and he was asked to cooperate with the prosecutors.

In June 2011, Le Canard enchaîné, Le Monde and other media revealed that Luc Ferry, a professor at Paris Diderot University since 1996 (or 1997, depending on sources) had not ever taught there—when he was minister, he was on leave, and when not on leave his obligation to teach was waived in order for him to undertake other official duties. Some of those came with compensation pay, while he was still paid as a professor. In 2010, however, a change in legislation (introduced by minister Valérie Pécresse) made the University financially autonomous. It did not want to have professors on its payroll that did not teach, which may have made its president liable for misuse of public funds; it then required Luc Ferry to do his allocated teaching share, which he declined to do. In 2011, according to some sources, the university is threatening to get him to refund his salary (€4,500 per month).

In the Yellow vests protests in 2019, Ferry suggested that the police should shoot to kill protesters.

Works
La pensée '68 (1985)
Homo Aestheticus (1990)
The New Ecological Order (1992)
Rights: The New Quarrel Between the Ancients and the Moderns
Man Made God: The Meaning of Life (1992)
The Wisdom of the Moderns (1998)
Political Philosophy
French Philosophy of the 60s with Alain Renaut
Why We Are Not Nietzscheans, editor with Alain Renaut
Qu'est-ce qu'une vie reussie?, (2002) Editions Grasset & Fasquelle
Le religieux après la religion (2004) with Marcel Gauchet
Apprendre à vivre (2006)
Vaincre les peurs. La philosophie comme amour de la sagesse,(2006), éditions Odile Jacob.
Kant. Une lecture des trois Critiques,(2006), éditions Grasset.
Familles, je vous aime : Politique et vie privée à l'âge de la mondialisation,(2007), XO Editions.
La tentation du christianisme with Lucien Jerphagnon, (2009), éditions Grasset.
La Révolution de l'amour (2010), Plon.
A Brief History of Thought: A Philosophical Guide to Living (2011)
On Love: A Philosophy for the Twenty-first Century (2012)
The Wisdom of the Myths: How Greek Mythology Can Change Your Life (2014)
La Révolution Transhumaniste. Comment la technomédecine et l'uberisation du monde vont bouleverser nos vies (2016), Plon.

References

PRIO page
 

 

1951 births
21st-century French politicians
21st-century French philosophers
Living people
People from Colombes
Academic staff of the University of Caen Normandy
French agnostics
French philosophers
French Ministers of National Education
French male non-fiction writers
French transhumanists
French comics writers
Pantheon-Sorbonne University alumni
Critics of animal rights
Heidelberg University alumni
Prix Médicis essai winners
Paris Diderot University alumni
Secular humanists